The Melland Nature Reserve is located on the western part of Skardsøya island in the municipality of Aure in Møre og Romsdal county, Norway. The nature reserve has the status of a Ramsar site because of its importance for migratory birds.

The area received protection in 2002 "to preserve an area that encompasses both protected wetlands and coastal areas rich in botanical species," according to the conservation regulations. The Melland Nature Reserve is bordered to the west by the Mellandsvågen Nature Reserve, which was established in 1998 and measures .

The area consists of a varied stretch of beach with diverse landscape elements. Rocky beaches dominate, but there is also a pebble beach. The bottoms of the shallow coves are covered in silt, sand, and gravel. The area has 78 registered plant species. The beach and shallow basins are important resting, overwintering, and nesting sites for birds.

References

External links
 Mijlø-direktoratet: Melland. Map and description of the nature reserve.
 Miljøverndepartementet. 2002. Melland naturreservat, Aure kommune, Møre og Romsdal fylke. 1:5000 map of the nature reserve.
 Forskrift om verneplan for havstrand og elveos i Møre og Romsdal, vedlegg 24, freding av Melland naturreservat, Aure kommune, Møre og Romsdal. 2002.

Nature reserves in Norway
Ramsar sites in Norway
Protected areas of Møre og Romsdal
Aure, Norway
Protected areas established in 2002